Leksvik is a former municipality in the old Nord-Trøndelag county (now in Trøndelag county), Norway.  The administrative center of the municipality was the village of Leksvik.  Other villages in Leksvik included Vanvikan, Seter, and Dalbygda.  Norwegian County Road 755 is the main road that connected the whole municipality from north to south.

The villages of Leksvik and Vanvikan were the two largest urban areas in Leksvik, notable for their high tech industries which have developed to become advanced and in demand. Areas with agriculture were also widespread, but most of the municipality was covered in forests and mountains where the wildlife ruled with animals such as moose and reindeer.  The moose are sometimes seen in the heart of Leksvik and Vanvikan, where modern downtown areas with commercial and residential developments are growing.

The  municipality was the 220th largest by area out of the then 426 municipalities in Norway at the time of its dissolution. Leksvik was the 249th most populous municipality in Norway with a population of 3,480.

General information

Leksvik was established as a municipality on 1 January 1838 (see formannskapsdistrikt). It was one of very few municipalities in Norway with unchanged borders since that date.

The municipality of Leksvik was merged with the neighboring municipality of Rissa on 1 January 2018.  The new municipality was named Indre Fosen and is located in the newly merged Trøndelag county.

Name
The municipality (originally the parish) is named after the old Leksvik farm since the first Leksvik Church was built there. The name of the river is possibly derived from the word lax which means "salmon".. Historically, the name has also been spelled Lexvigen or Leksviken.

Coat of arms
The coat of arms was granted on 28 September 1990 and they were in use until 1 January 2018 when the municipality was dissolved (the same arms were re-adopted for the new Indre Fosen Municipality after the merger of Leksvik and Rissa Municipality on that date). The official blazon is "Per chevron embowed azure and argent point ending in trefoil". This means the arms have a field (background) that is divided by a line in the shape of a chevron with curved sides that meet at a point. A trefoil is located on top of this point. The background above the line is blue and the background below this line has a tincture of argent which means it is commonly colored white, but if it is made out of metal, then silver is used. The blue part represents the Trondheimsfjord and the white/silver part represents the land, particularly the Amborneset peninsula where King Sverre Sigurdsson fought his last sea battle on 8 June 1198. There is a clover/trefoil design at the end of the silver part which represents life and growth. The arms were designed by Einar H. Skjærvold.

Churches
The Church of Norway had one parish within the municipality of Leksvik. It was part of the Fosen prosti (deanery) in the Diocese of Nidaros.

Geography
Leksvik was located on the eastern side of the Fosen peninsula along the coast of Trondheimsfjorden.  There are two large lakes located in Leksvik: Storvatnet and Meltingvatnet.

Government
While it existed, this municipality was responsible for primary education (through 10th grade), outpatient health services, senior citizen services, unemployment and other social services, zoning, economic development, and municipal roads. During its existence, this municipality was governed by a municipal council of elected representatives, which in turn elected a mayor.

Municipal council
The municipal council  of Leksvik was made up of 25 representatives that were elected to four year terms.  The party breakdown of the final municipal council was as follows:

Mayors
The mayors of Leksvik:

1838–1840: Johan Albricht Carl Dons
1840–1841: Nils Hjellup
1842–1845: Christopher Winther Scheen
1845-1846: Ole H. Krabseth
1846–1849: Petter A. Grande
1850–1857: Ole J. Moholdt	
1858–1859: Ole Aalberg
1860–1863: Hans Bull Motzfeldt
1864–1865: Ole J. Moholdt 
1866–1869: Ole Aalberg
1870–1871: Aage Casper Larsen Winge 
1872–1883: Hans Bull Motzfeldt (H)
1884–1888: Carl Ludvig Møller (H)
1888–1893: Ole Moxnes (V)
1894–1895: Hans Strand (H)
1896–1897: Ole Moxnes (V)
1898–1916: Hans Strand (H)
1917–1922: Karl Myran (Av)
1923–1925: Arnt Bye 	
1926–1937: Edvard Grande (V)
1938–1941: P.A. Rosvold (H)
1941–1945: Hartvig Dalsaune 
1945–1947: P.A. Rosvold (H)
1948–1949: Ole Graven (V)
1950–1951: Ole Hindrum (Bp)
1952–1960: Elias Grande (V)
1961–1963: Johan Hindrum (Sp)
1964–1967: Hans Kirkhus (V)
1968–1979: Ingvar Sæther (Sp)
1980–1983: Olav Moholdt (KrF)
1984–1985: Ingvar Sæther (Sp)
1986–1995: Ingebjørg Karmhus (Sp)
1995–2003: Einar Strøm (Sp)
2003–2007: Borghild Husdal Buhaug (Sp)
2007–2015: Einar Strøm (Sp)
2015–2017: Steinar Saghaug (H)

History
The first inhabitants are believed to have moved to Leksvik some 3,000 years ago. They left several pieces of cutting tools which are now placed in museums. But Leksvik does not appear in recorded history before the Viking Age when the villages Leksvik and Hindrem became quite important in the local area. In both Leksvik and Hindrem there have been found great tombs and ruins of buildings and longboats. On Borgen, there is a hill between Hindrem and Seter that may have been a great Viking fortress, but this could also be tracks made by the glaciers during the last ice age. After the Black Death struck Norway in 1349, Leksvik fell into silence for some 300 years.

In more modern history, Leksvik and Hindrem are small and relatively isolated villages, north of Trondheim Fjord.  Two churches stood here, a church in Leksvik and a stave church in Hindrem, but this broke down in 1655 and was replaced by a modern wooden church. In the 19th century, the church of Hindrem was demolished, and the new Stranda Church was built in Vanvikan.  Leksvik became well known for its goats and had 5,000 of them at their peak number.

During World War II, Leksvik was settled by German troops with the main camp on the top of Våttåhaugen, a hill north of the village of Leksvik. But as a small and isolated village, nothing of great importance happened there during the war, and it was mostly peaceful although bombs fell over Trondheim, on the south side of the fjord. After electric power first came to Leksvik, Bjørn Lyng founded the first industry in Vanvikan and Leksvik.  After the first road was finally finished in the early 1960s, industry grew rapidly and replaced the goats.

Notable people

References

External links

Webcam showing the view from Leksvik in the direction of Frosta
European ash north to Leksvik

 
Populated places established in 1838
Populated places disestablished in 2018
Former municipalities of Norway
1838 establishments in Norway
2018 disestablishments in Norway